Pernille Mølgaard Hansen later Kaagaard is a former Danish badminton player. In 1964 she won both the National Championship and National Under-18 Championship and followed this up with five more National titles and 34 caps for Denmark from 1965-1977. 
She is best known for her All England title triumph in 1970 with her mixed doubles partner Per Walsøe.

Medal Record at the All England Badminton Championships

References

Danish female badminton players